Agrat bat Mahlat (אגרת בת מחלת) is a demon in Jewish mythology.

Etymology
Mahlat and Agrat are proper names, "bat" meaning "daughter of" (Hebrew). Therefore, Agrat bat Mahlat means "Agrat, daughter of Mahlat."

In ancient texts
In the rabbinic literature of Yalḳuṭ Ḥadash, on the eves of Wednesday and Saturday, she is "the dancing roof-demon" who haunts the air with her chariot and her train of 18 messengers/angels of spiritual destruction. She dances while her mother, or possibly grandmother, Lilith howls.

She is also "the mistress of the sorceresses" who communicated magic secrets to Amemar, a Jewish sage.

In the Zohar
In Zoharistic Kabbalah, she is a queen of the demons and an angel of sacred prostitution, who mates with archangel Samael along with Lilith and Naamah, sometimes adding Eisheth as a fourth mate.

According to legend, Agrat and Lilith visited King Solomon disguised as prostitutes. The spirits Solomon communicated with Agrat were all placed inside of a genie lamp-like vessel and set inside of a cave on the cliffs of the Dead Sea. Later, after the spirits were cast into the lamp, Agrat bat Mahlat and her lamp were discovered by King David. Agrat then mated with him a night and bore him a demonic son, Asmodeus, who is identified with Hadad the Edomite.

In other sources
In a Kabbalistic treatise by Nathan Spira (died in 1662), it is explained that Mahlat was daughter to Ishmael and his wife, who was herself daughter of Egyptian sorcerer Kasdiel. Mother and daughter were exiled to the desert, where the demon Igrathiel mated with Mahlat and engendered Agrat or Igrat. Mahlat later became Esau's wife.

About 1000 years after the era of Solomon and David, another widely known intervention occurred known as "The spiritual intervention of Hanina ben Dosa and Rabbi Abaye" which ended up curbing her malevolent powers over humans.

References

Three Books of Occult Philosophy, Heinrich Cornelius Agrippa (edited and annotated by Donald Tyson), Llewellyn Sourcebook Series.

Individual angels
Angels in Judaism
Demons in Judaism
Succubi